Malta is scheduled to compete at the 2019 European Games in Minsk from 21 to 30 June 2019. Malta is represented by 4 athletes in 3 sports.

Competitors

Cycling

Road
Men

Judo

Men

Shooting

Women

References 

Nations at the 2019 European Games
European Games
2019